The 2015 Nigeria Entertainment Awards was the 10th edition of the Nigeria Entertainment Awards. Wizkid won the most awards while Olamide received the most nominations with three across 39 award categories. Kiss Daniel won the Best New Act to Watch award while Praiz won the Best R&B Act award after he toppled the likes of Banky W, Chidinma, Seyi Shay, Timi Dakolo and Shaydee. The award was held at the Skirball Center for the Performing Arts, New York City, U.S.A and was hosted by Osas Ighodaro and Ice Prince.

Winners and nominees
Below is the list of nominees and winners for the popular music categories. Winners are highlighted in bold.

Musical categories

Hottest Single of The Year
"Ojuelegba – Wizkid"
"Woju" – Kiss Daniel
"Shoki Remix" – Lil Kesh, Olamide, Davido
"Godwin" – Korede Bello
"Shake Body" – Skales
"Dorobucci" – The Mavins

Best New Act to Watch
Kiss Daniel
Di'Ja
CDQ
Korede Bello
Lil Kesh
Ayo Jay
Falz

Gospel Artist of The Year
Tope Alabi
Obiwon
Eben
Nathaniel Bassey
Psalm Ebube
Onos Ariyo
Flo

Indigenous Artist of the Year
Pasuma
Olamide
Phyno
Flavour N'abania
MC Galaxy
Jaywon

Best R&B Artist of the Year
Praiz
Banky W
Chidinma
Seyi Shay
Timi Dakolo
Shaydee

Best Pop Artist of the Year
Davido
Sean Tizzle
Presh
Wizkid
Runtown
Burna Boy

Female Artist of the Year
Yemi Alade
Aramide
Seyi Shay
Cynthia Morgan
Di'Ja
Eva Alordiah

Male Artist of the Year
Wizkid
Olamide
Skales
Flavour N'abania
Davido
Patoranking

Best Rap Act of the Year
Olamide
Reminisce
Ice Prince
Phyno
Falz
M.I

Music Producer of the Year
Shizzi
Pheelz
Legendury Beatz
Young Jonn
DJ Coublon
T Spize

Best Music Video of the Year (Artist and Director)
"Aww" – Di'Ja and Unlimited LA
"Ibadan" – QDot featuring Olamide) and HG2 Films
"Condo" – YCEE featuring Patoranking and Clarence Peters
"Shugga" – Eva  and Woltrk Ent & Radioactiiv
"Onye" – Waje featuring Tiwa Savage and Kemi Adetiba
"Crazy" – Seyi Shay and Meji Alabi & JM Films

Most Promising Act to Watch
Simi
Danagog
Niniola
TJan
Tonye
Pere Carter
Sunkanmi
TeeGee Da Unusual

Diaspora Artist of the Year
Stylezz
Bils
Jay Cube
Emmy Gee
Moelogo
Lioness

African Artist of the Year (Non-Nigerian)
Eddy Kenzo
Diamond Platnumz
Sauti Sol
Sarkodie
Stonebwoy
AKA
MzVee

Afrobeat Artist of the Year
2face Idibia
Lagbaja
Femi Kuti
Seun Kuti
Tony Oladipo Allen
Ara

Best Dance/Live Performance
MC Galaxy
Yemi Alade
P-Square
Omawumi
Wizkid
Olamide

Album of the Year
Thankful – Flavour N'abania
Baba Hafusa – Reminisce
Street OT – Olamide
King of Queens – Yemi Alade
Ayo – Wizkid
Rich & Famous – Praiz

Best Collabo of The Year
"Bad Girl Remix" – Mr 2Kay featuring Seyi Shay & Cynthia Morgan
"Indomie Remix" – Mastercraft featuring CDQ & Davido
"Shoki" – Lil Kesh featuring Davido & Olamide
"Collabo" – P-Square featuring Don Jazzy
"Condo" – YCEE featuring Patoranking
"Marry Me" – Falz featuring Yemi Alade

Film categories

Actor of the Year (Nollywood)
Gabriel Afolayan (The Antique)
Kunle Afolayan (October 1)
Wole Ojo (Brave)
OC Ukeje (Secret Room)
Yakubu Mohammed (Dark Closet)
Femi Jacobs (The Meeting)

Actress of the Year (Nollywood)
Ruth Kadiri (Matter Arising)
Rita Dominic (The Meeting)
Weruche Opia (When Love Happens)
Linda Ejiofor (Secret Room)
Joke Silva (Folly)
Kehinde Bankole (October 1)

Film Director of the Year (Nollywood)
Kunle Afolayan ([[October 1 (film)|October 1]]
Eneaji Chris (Secret Room)
Mildred Okwo (The Meeting
DJ Tee & Darasen Richards (The Antique)
Stanlee Ohikhuare (Verdict)
LowlaDee (Brave)

Actor of the Year (Indigenous Films)
Adekola Odunlade
Obi Emelonye
Zubby Micheal
Ibikunle Oladipo
Jide Kosoko
Yakubu Mohammed

Actress of the Year (Indigenous Films)
Toyin Aimakhu (Alakada)
Aborisade Abisola (Temiloluwa ATM)
Fathia Balogun (Iya Alalake)
Halima Fatete (Har da Mijina)
Onyekachukwu Okeke (Olanma)
Ariyike Akinyanju (Eyinju Eledumare)

Film Director of the Year (Indigenous Films)
Olanrewaju Abiodun
Blessing Adejumo
Amechi Ukeje
Niji Akanni
Okey Zubelu
Ugezu J. Ugezu

Film of the Year (Indigenous Films)
Alakada
Ibaje
Wazo
Eyinju Eledumare
Har da Mijina
Onye Ozi

Film of the Year – Producer (Africa)
Shattered Romance
Far
Devil in the Detail
A Letter from Adam
Fundi-Mentals

Actor of the Year (Africa)
Majid Michel (Knocking on Heavens Doors)
Adjetey Anang (Devil in the Detail)
Gerald Langiri (Fundi-Mentals)
James Gardiner (Shattered Romance)

Actress of the Year (Africa)
Sonia Ibrahim
Terry Pheto
Joselyn Dumas
Lydia Forson
Okawa Shaznay

Film Director of the Year (Africa)
Alex Konstantaras
Shirley Frimpong-Manso
Eddie Nartey
Gilbert Agbor
Sam Kessie

Actor of the Year (Nigeria in Hollywood)
Chiwetel Ejiofor
Adewale Akinnuoye-Agbaje
David Oyelowo
Hakeem Kae Kazeem
Gbenga Akinnagbe

Actress of the Year (Nigeria in Hollywood)
Adepero Oduye
Carmen Ejogo
Caroline Chikezie
Enuka Okuma

References

Nigeria
2015 music awards
Nigeria Entertainment Awards
Ent 
Ent